The 1986–87 American Indoor Soccer Association season was the third season of the league.  The Columbus Capitals and Kalamazoo Kangaroos did not return after the 1985–86 season. Four teams, including former NASL stalwarts, Tampa Bay Rowdies, joined the league in 1986–87. The Fort Wayne Flames, Memphis Storm and Toledo Pride were all newly formed expansion teams. The addition of Tampa Bay in particular, and Memphis to a lesser degree, marked the AISA's first clubs outside of the Midwest. Rudy Pikuzinski of Canton won the league scoring title en route to his first of three straight MVP awards, while Memphis boss Terry Nicholl took home Coach of the Year honors.

Just as in previous AISA seasons, Canton and Louisville proved to be the class of the league and faced each other in the finals for a third straight year. For the first time the championship series went the full five games, and in a clash of titans, the Thunder finally bested their rivals, three games to two. Alas, the Thunder's glory would be short lived, as Game 5 proved to be their final match ever. Ownership, no longer able to bear the financial losses, opted to shut the team down instead trying to defend their crown for 1987–88.

League Standings

Northern Division

Southern Division

All-Star Game
On February 21 the Louisville Thunder hosted the AISA All-Star Game. Instead of using the Thunder's home field of Broadbent Arena at the state fairgrounds, the match was played at the more intimate Louisville Gardens in downtown Louisville. In a departure from the previous season, both squads were composed of mixed rosters. In the past, the host team had faced all-stars from the rest of the league's teams. The Northern Division all-stars wore blue jerseys, while the Southern squad wore grey. Players on the winning side each received a $100 bonus. The Northern Division squad defeated their Southern counterparts by a score of 7–5. Louisville forward Zoran Savic (1 goal, 2 assists) and Canton goalie, Jamie Swanner (11 saves, 2 goals given), were named the game's offensive and defensive MVPs respectively. Although neither game would come to pass, it was also announced that the 1988 All-Star game would be hosted by Tampa Bay, with the 1989 game being awarded to Milwaukee.

Southern Division roster
Coach: Terry Nicholl, Memphis

*Original selection Rubén Astigarraga of Tampa Bay was unable to play and was replaced by teammate Tim Walters.

Northern Division roster
Coach: Trevor Dawkins, Canton

Match report

Playoffs

League Leaders

Scoring

Goalkeeping

League awards
Most Valuable Player: Rudy Pikuzinski, Canton 
Coach of the Year: Terry Nicholl, Memphis 
Defender of the Year: Tim Tyma, Canton 
Goalkeeper of the Year: Jamie Swanner, Canton 
Rookie of the Year: Paul Zimmerman, Chicago

All-AISA Teams

References

External links
Major Indoor Soccer League II (RSSSF)
1987 in American Soccer

1986 in American soccer leagues
1987 in American soccer leagues
1986-87